Turner's thick-toed gecko (Chondrodactylus turneri) is a species of lizard in the family Gekkonidae. The species is endemic to southern Africa.

Etymology
The specific name, turneri, is in honor of British entomologist James Aspinall Turner.

Geographic range
C. turneri is found in Angola, Botswana, Eswatini, Kenya, Malawi, Mozambique, Namibia, Rwanda, South Africa, Tanzania, Zambia, and Zimbabwe.

Description

Behaviour
Turner's thick-toed gecko is nocturnal and lives on rocks and buildings.

Diet
C. turneri is an ambush predator and feeds on invertebrates and whatever else it can catch and overpower.

Reproduction
C. turneri is oviparous.

References

Further reading
Branch, Bill (2004). Field Guide to Snakes and other Reptiles of Southern Africa. Third Revised edition, Second impression. Sanibel Island, Florida: Ralph Curtis Books. 399 pp. . (Pachydactylus turneri, pp. 254–255 + Plate 84).
Eifler MA, Marchand R, Eifler DA, Malela K (2017). "Habitat Use and Activity Patterns in the Nocturnal Gecko, Chondrodactylus turneri ". Herpetologica 73 (1): 43–47. 
Gramentz D (2004). "Das Antiprädationsverhalten von Pachydactylus turneri (GRAY 1864)". Sauria 26 (2): 37–41. (in German).
Gramentz D (2005). "Zur Ökologie und Ethologie von Pachydactylus turneri (GRAY, 1864) in Zentral Namibia". Sauria 27 (2): 17–22. (in German).
Gray JE (1864). "Notes on some New Lizards from South-Eastern Africa, with the Descriptions of several New Species". Annals and Magazine of Natural History, Third Series 14: 380–384. (Homodactylus turneri, new species, pp. 381–382).
Rösler H (2000). "Kommentierte Liste der rezent, subrezent und fossil bekannten Geckotaxa (Reptilia: Gekkonomorpha)". Gekkota 2: 28–153, (Pachydactylus turneri, p. 100). (in German).
Spawls, Stephen; Howell, Kim; Hinkel, Harald; Menegon, Michele (2018). Field Guide to East African Reptiles, Second Edition. London: Bloomsbury Natural History. 624 pp. .

Reptiles of South Africa
Geckos of Africa
Reptiles described in 1864
Taxa named by John Edward Gray
Chondrodactylus